Amnatcharoen School (pronounced: Am-nat-cha-roen) is a state school with public research school in north east (isan) at Amnatcharoen, Thailand. Established back in 1951 as School of Provincial High School of Amnatcharoen Province Thailand. This school is a special large secondary school of the Department of Secondary Education Area Office District 29. Besides that, it is also one of The World Class Standard School (WCSS) in country.

School History 
Amnatcharoen School established on June 12, 1951 according to the province's book 5858/2494 opened teaching at Bungchanwittaya School(Currently it is an Anuban Amnatcharoen School). At that time, there was only one teacher teaching, namely Mr.Plien Oupariwong.

At present, Amnatcharoen School is located at 277, Village No. 13, Chayangkun Road, Bung Sub-district, Mueang District, Amnatcharoen Province which was moved to be established at this place and Amnatcharoenpittayakom School as the first branch of this school.

Reputation 
Amnatcharoen School It is a famous school in law, ICT, foreign language And arts such as music or dance. Every academic year there will be many students competing in these activities and winning many awards.

This school is a successful school in the area of the groundwater bank several government agencies have visited this school's research works to be applied to organizations and society because this research can effectively tackle drought and flood problems.

Courses offered 
Amnatcharoen School Has offered courses from grade 7 to grade 12 with the following study plans and courses.

 Normal Program
 Science and mathematics program
 Art and foreign language program
 Foreign language and dance or art program
 Foreign language with career and technology program
 Special Program
 Mini English Program (MEP)
 Advance Program (AP)
 Pre-Cadet Program (PP)
 Laws Program (LP)
 Information and communication technology program (ICTP)

Extracurricular activities 
In addition to studying The school also organizes various activities. For students such as Christmas activities, national children's day activities, sports day activities, freshmen orientation, various camp activities in school, orientation activities, finishing activities Including various activities On important days in Thailand.

School Colors 
Amnatcharoen School Has established a color faculty To conduct sports activities and to strengthen unity among the group. By using the method of dividing by dividing into rooms In which all students in 7 class will belong to the same color team And will change the color of the team again when entering grade 10.
  Red Team is the color of the science department
  Yellow Team is the color of the mathematics and art department
  Green Team is the color of the thai language, career and Technology department
  Blue Team is the color of the foreign language department
  Pink Team is the main color for social studies, religion and culture department

Personnel

Notable alumni 

 Pongsakorn Mettarikanon - Actor 
 Ratchapat Worrasarn - Actor

Principal

Notes 

 ANC Logo is The lotus flower has a flame around the torch. If in Pali, it means "Sikka Chewitta Chotana" meaning "Education makes life glorious".

References

External links 
Official website of Amnatcharoen School
 Amnatcharoen School Thai Wikipedia
Amnatcharoen School Page

Schools in Thailand
Amnat Charoen province